The Little Minister is a 1915 British silent romance film directed by Percy Nash and starring Joan Ritz, Gregory Scott and Henry Vibart. It was based on an 1891 novel The Little Minister by J.M. Barrie which was subsequently turned into a play The Little Minister in 1897. It was one of five film adaptations of the story.

Cast
 Joan Ritz - Babbie
 Gregory Scott - Gavin Dishart
 Henry Vibart - Rob Dow
 Fay Davis - Margaret Dishart
 Dame May Whitty - Nanny Webster
 Douglas Payne - Lord Rintoul
 Frank Tennant - Captain Halliwell
 John Marlborough East - Thomas Whamond
 Brian Daly - Snecky Hobart
 Douglas Cox - Silva Tosh
 Alfred Wilmore - Micah Dow

References

External links

1915 films
British silent feature films
1915 romantic drama films
Films based on works by J. M. Barrie
Films directed by Percy Nash
British romantic drama films
British black-and-white films
1910s English-language films
1910s British films
Silent romantic drama films